Ian James Hughes (born 24 August 1961) is an English former professional footballer who played as a defender for Sunderland.

References

1961 births
Living people
Footballers from Sunderland
English footballers
Association football defenders
Sunderland A.F.C. players
Barnsley F.C. players
English Football League players